Dame Iritana Te Rangi Tāwhiwhirangi  (born 21 March 1929) is a New Zealand advocate of Māori language education and the Kōhanga Reo movement.

Biography
Born in Hicks Bay on 21 March 1929, Tāwhiwhirangi or auntie E is of Ngāti Porou, Ngāti Kahungunu, Ngāpuhi, Canadian and English descent. She was educated at Hukarere Girls' School from 1943 to 1946, and then Wellington Teachers' College from 1947 to 1948.

She is a life member of the Māori Women's Welfare League and Toitū Kaupapa Māori Mātauranga – Māori Education Trust. She is on the Board of Trustees of the Te Kōhanga Reo National Trust.

Honours and awards
Tāwhiwhirangi was awarded the New Zealand 1990 Commemoration Medal, and in the 1992 New Year Honours, she was appointed a Member of the Order of the British Empire, in recognition of her role as general manager of Te Kōhanga Reo National Trust. In 1993, she received the New Zealand Suffrage Centennial Medal.

In the 2001 New Year Honours, Tawhiwhirangi was appointed a Companion of the New Zealand Order of Merit for services to Māori education, and in the 2009 Queen's Birthday Honours she was promoted to Dame Companion, also for services to Māori education.

She was a finalist for the 2014 New Zealander of the Year Awards.

References

External links
 
 

1929 births
Living people
New Zealand educators
New Zealand Māori schoolteachers
Ngāti Porou people
Ngāti Kahungunu people
Ngāpuhi people
Māori language revivalists
New Zealand Members of the Order of the British Empire
Dames Companion of the New Zealand Order of Merit
Recipients of the New Zealand Suffrage Centennial Medal 1993
People from Hicks Bay
People educated at Hukarere Girls' College
People of the Māori Women's Welfare League
Early childhood education in New Zealand